European Grand Prix can refer to:

European Grand Prix, a Formula One motor race
European motorcycle Grand Prix
Speedway Grand Prix of Europe
European Grand Prix for Choral Singing
AIACR European Championship of grand prix racing in the 1930s